Xinjiang Normal University (XJNU) is a public university in the Xinjiang Uyghur Autonomous Region of the People's Republic of China, which was established in December 1978 with the approval of the Ministry of Education, and its predecessors were Ürümqi First Normal School and Xinjiang Teacher Training Department.

Alumni
Gulchehra Hoja, journalist

References

External links 
 Official Website (Chinese)

Universities and colleges in Xinjiang
Teachers colleges in China
Education in Ürümqi